WMFV (89.5 FM) is a radio station in Ocala, Florida, broadcasting a public radio format as a member of National Public Radio. Licensed to the unincorporated suburb of Cedar Creek (near the western entrance of the Ocala National Forest), the station is currently owned by Community Communications of Orlando as a semi-satellite of Central Florida's main NPR station, WMFE-FM (90.7) and is operated out of WMFE's studios in Orlando. In addition to Ocala, WMFV serves The Villages, an age-restricted master planned development. This arrangement is similar to a commercial station in Orlando, as Fox's O&O television station WOFL (channel 35) has Ocala-based WOGX (channel 51) also serve as a semi-satellite station.

After 15 years as a contemporary Christian music station, the then-WKSG 89.5, known as Daystar Radio 89.5, changed formats New Year's Day 2008 to a carefully researched and blended mix of big band, smooth jazz and select AAA (Adult Album Alternative) music calling itself "The Boulevard". The station was owned by Daystar Public Radio, Inc (a company completely unrelated to television's Daystar network).

The WKSG call letters were previously used by Detroit-area FM 102.7, now WDKL.

On September 25, 2017, it was announced that WKSG was sold by Daystar to Community Communications. The deal expanded WMFE's footprint to an underserved area of Central Florida, including portions of Lake and Marion counties.

The station changed its call sign to WMFV on January 4, 2018. The sale closed on January 5, 2018.

On Saturday, March 3, 2018, the station soft-launched under CCI management, carrying WMFE's locally originated programming and NPR's Morning Edition and All Things Considered, with automated classical music from Classical 24 outside of that time.

In early September 2019, the station dropped classical music, along with some local programming, replacing it with additional news/talk programming from WMFE-FM and other public radio sources.

Previous logo

The last logo under previous Daystar ownership.

References

External links

MFV
Radio stations established in 1999
1999 establishments in Florida